Dragon Gate is a Japanese professional wrestling promotion that was founded in 2004. This is a list of their current wrestlers that appear on their shows, as well as their ‘unit’ (team, faction). Other notes included are those of injured wrestlers, championships wrestlers hold, and if they're a sporadic or dormant character. This page is kept up to date with changes on Dragon Gate's official website.

Roster 

This is a list of professional wrestlers who currently wrestle for Dragon Gate. This list also acknowledges which stable (referred to by Dragon Gate as "units") a wrestler is a part of – this is listed as it is considered by the company to be a vital part of Dragon Gate. "(L)" indicates the leader of the group. Executive officers, referees and ring announcers are also listed.

There are six central units in Dragon Gate:

Wrestlers

Dormant/Sporadic characters

Staff

Alumni

Former wrestlers

Akebono
Akira Tozawa
Anthony W. Mori
Cima
El Lindaman
Flamita
HUB
Masato Inaba
Jack Evans
Jushin Thunder Liger
Kazma Sakamoto
Magnitude Kishiwada
Masato Yoshino
Matt Sydal
Milano Collection AT
Naoki Tanizaki
Pac
Rich Swann
Ricochet
Shingo Takagi
Shinobu
T-Hawk
Taku Iwasa
Takuya Sugawara
Tigers Mask
Uhaa Nation

Past units

 R.E.D.
 Masquerade
 Mad Blankey
 Muscle Outlaw'z
 New Hazard
 Tokyo Gurentai

References

External links

Dragon Gate roster on Cagematch.net

Dragon Gate (wrestling)
Dragon Gate
Dragon Gate